MaryAnne Victoria Stevens (born April 1947) is a British art historian and curator. From 2005 to 2007, she was secretary of the Royal Academy.

In 2005, Stevens succeeded Lawton Fitt as secretary of the Royal Academy.

In 2013, Stevens left the Royal Academy, after working there for 29 years.

References

1947 births
British art historians
Women art historians
British curators
Living people
British women curators